Ian Fleming (born 1935) is an English organic chemist, and an emeritus professor of the University of Cambridge, and an emeritus fellow of Pembroke College, Cambridge. He was the first to determine the full structure of chlorophyll (in 1967) and was involved in the development of the synthesis of cyanocobalamin by Robert Burns Woodward.  He has made major contributions to the use of organosilicon compounds for stereospecific syntheses; reactions which have found application in the synthesis of natural compounds.  He is also a prolific author, and has written a number of textbooks, encyclopedia chapters and influential review articles.

Life and research

Ian Fleming was born August 4, 1935, in Staffordshire  and grew up in Stourbridge, Worcestershire. He received a B.A. in 1959 and a Ph.D. in 1962, both from Pembroke College, Cambridge. His post-doctoral studies were done at Harvard University with R.B. Woodward on the synthesis of vitamin B12.  He has made advances in the topic of stereochemistry, developing new synthetic reactions.  He has also pioneered the applications of organosilicon chemistry for organic synthesis, especially for the production of chiral molecules, and synthesized the highly stable 8-cycloheptatrienylheptafulvenyl carbocation.

Prof. Fleming has an extensive list of over 200 scientific publications, including major contributions to the chemical encyclopedia "Comprehensive Organic Chemistry", and many influential review articles.  He has also authored popular undergraduate textbooks on spectroscopic methods of structure determination, organic synthesis, and applications of frontier molecular orbital theory to problems in organic chemistry.

Awards and prizes
1981 Tilden lectureship of the Royal Society of Chemistry
1983 Prize for Organic Synthesis 
1993 Elected a Fellow of the Royal Society

References

External links
Biographical note, Chemistry Department Lectures, The University of Illinois at Urbana-Champaign
Article on Stereochemical Control in Organic Synthesis with biographical note
Home page

English chemists
1935 births
Harvard University alumni
People from Stourbridge
Living people
Fellows of Pembroke College, Cambridge
Fellows of the Royal Society
Members of the University of Cambridge Department of Chemistry